Assiculus is a genus of fish in the "dottyback" family Pseudochromidae. It is monotypic, containing only Assiculus punctatus. It is a small species of dottyback which is covered in small, bright blue spots. The males are bluish in colour while the females are greenish-yellow and are smaller than the males. This secretive species frequents areas where there are highly eroded limestone reefs and rocks. 

The genus and species were first published by Sir John Richardson in an appendix to Volume 1 of John Lort Stokes' 1846 Discoveries in Australia. The specific name punctatus references the small blue spots on the dorsal part of the body and fins.

References 

Fish of Australia
Fauna of Western Australia
Pseudochrominae
Monotypic ray-finned fish genera
Monotypic marine fish genera
Taxa named by John Richardson (naturalist)
Fish described in 1846